Pontus Andreasson (born 24 August 1998) is a Swedish professional ice hockey forward currently playing for the Grand Rapids Griffins in the American Hockey League (AHL) as a prospect to the Detroit Red Wings of the National Hockey League (NHL). He previously played for Frölunda HC and Luleå HF of the Swedish Hockey League (SHL).

Playing career
Andreasson made his professional debut for Frölunda HC during the 2017–18 season, where he appeared in one game. During the 2021–22 season, in his first full SHL season with Luleå HF, he recorded 18 goals and 20 assists in 52 regular season game. He ranked second in goals (18), tied for first in assists (20), second in points (38) and second in power-play goals (5) among SHL rookies. 

On 31 March 2022, in the first quarterfinals game of the SHL Playoffs, Andreasson recorded his first career hat-trick. On 8 April, he recorded the game-winning goal in double-overtime to send Luleå to the semifinals. This was his playoff-leading seventh goal in five quarterfinal games. He finished the playoffs with eight goals and five assists in 13 postseason games, helping Luleå reach the SHL finals.

On 16 May 2022, Andreasson signed a one-year contract with the Detroit Red Wings of the NHL.

Career statistics

References

External links
 

1998 births
Living people
IF Björklöven players
Finnish ice hockey forwards
Frölunda HC players
Grand Rapids Griffins players
Luleå HF players
People from Munkedal Municipality
Sportspeople from Västra Götaland County